"Born to Love You" is a song recorded by American country music band Lanco. Lead vocalist Brandon Lancaster wrote the song with Ross Copperman, Ashley Gorley, and Josh Osborne. It is the third single from the band's debut album Hallelujah Nights.

Content
The song is about the small towns in which the narrator was raised, while also stating that he is "born to love" his lover. Lanco lead singer Brandon Lancaster, who co-wrote the song, told blog The Boot that " It pays homage to where we all come from. We grew up in little towns across the Southeast, and we all come from different places, but when you start talking about it, they all kind of sound like the same place... This song explores that, and talks about how, when you're from a certain place, you may feel that a certain path is set out for you, but if there's a person that you love in your life, no matter what you end up doing or where you end up going, you're kind of doing it for them anyways." He also told American Songwriter that he intended for the song to be "anthemic", and that he liked its arrangement because "It starts out a bit laid back and builds into this real rocking and up-tempo song that reflects the lyrics."

Commercial performance
The song has sold 103,000 copies in the United States as of November 2018.

Music video
Directed by Roman White, the song's video features the band performing in a variety of visual settings.

Charts

Weekly charts

Year-end charts

Certifications

References

2018 singles
2017 songs
Lanco (band) songs
Songs written by Ross Copperman
Songs written by Ashley Gorley
Songs written by Josh Osborne
Song recordings produced by Jay Joyce
Music videos directed by Roman White
Arista Nashville singles